Vayu STUTI is one of the most famous Stutis (poems) composed by Sri Trivikrama Panditacharya in praise of Sri Madhvacharya, the founder of the Dvaita school of philosophy. Madhvas, or the followers of Sri Madhvacharya, know that Madhvacharya is the third incarnation of Lord Mukhyaprana, being the first incarnation or Vayu who is the main deity and the Vayu Stuti has been written recognizing this order of incarnation.

Legend has it that during daily puja done by Sri Madhvacharya in the sanctum sanctorum of Udupi Sri Krishna temple behind closed doors, Trivikrama Panditacharya used to recite the Dvadasha stotra outside. The end of naivedya or ceremonial offering of food to the Lard was indicated by sounding of bells. However one day, Trivikrama Panditacharya got increasingly curious as the sound of bells was not heard even after a long time. He peeked through the door and to his utter amazement found Sri Madhva performing puja to Lord Shri Rama as Hanuman, to Lord Krishna as Bhimasena and to Lord Veda Vyasa as Madhvacharya. Overcome by Bhakti, he composed the Vayu Stuti and dedicated it to Madhvacharya.

The Vayu Stuti comprises 41 paras. It is usual practice to chant the Vayu Stuti by starting and ending it with the Narasimha Nakha Stuti, a short two-para composition by Sri Madhva in praise of Lord Narasimha. It is said that when Trivikrama Panditacharya presented his work, Sri Madhva insisted that the work should not be dedicated to his praise alone and instantly composed the Nakha Stuti and instructed that it be chanted before and after the Vayu Stuti.

The Vayu Stuti is also known as Hari Vayu Stuti

See also 
 Works of Madhvacharya
 Narayana Panditacharya

References 
 Mukhya Prana
 Sanskrit Text of Vayu Stuti
 Mukhya Prana - The Avatar of Vayu
 Detailed explanation of each Shloka
 Learn Vayu Stuthi

Dvaita Vedanta
Hindu texts
Sanskrit texts